Guillac may refer to:

Guillac, Gironde, Gironde department, Nouvelle-Aquitaine, France
Guillac, Morbihan, Morbihan department, Brittany, France